Below is a list of the current District Chiefs in Sierra Leone. In the government of Sierra Leone, Paramount Chiefs are nonpartisan Members of Parliament. There are District Chiefs representing every district besides the Freetown Districts.

 Bo District, Southern Region – Paramount Chief Joe Kangbai Macavoray
 Bombali District, Northern Region – Paramount Chief Kandeh Finoh III
 Bonthe District, Southern Region – Paramount Chief Alie Badara Sheriff
 Falaba District, Northern Region – Paramount Chief Fasalie Kulako Demba Marrah III
 Kailahun District, Eastern Region – Paramount Chief Cyril Foray Gondor II
 Kambia District, Northern Region – Paramount Chief Bai Farama Tass Bubu Ngbnak IV
 Karene District, Northern Region – Paramount Chief Kandeh Wusu Sesay III
 Kenema District, Eastern Region – Paramount Chief Prince Mambu Pewa III
 Koinadugu District, Northern Region – Paramount Chief Bai Farama Tass Bubu Ngbnak IV
 Kono District, Eastern Region – Paramount Chief Sahr Youngai Kontanday Mbriwa II
 Moyamba District, Southern Region – Paramount Chief Haja Fatmata Bintu Koroma Meama-Kajue
 Port Loko District, Northern Region – Paramount Chief Bai Sherbora Sehba Gbereh
 Pujehun District, Southern Region – Paramount Chief Matilda Yayu Lansana Minah

References

Pramount Chiefs
Paramount Chiefs
Paramount Chiefs